The 1946 Rhode Island gubernatorial election was held on November 5, 1946. Incumbent Democrat John Pastore defeated Republican nominee John G. Murphy with 54.27% of the vote.

General election

Candidates
John Pastore, Democratic 
John G. Murphy, Republican

Results

References

1946
Rhode Island
Gubernatorial
November 1946 events in the United States